D501 is a state road connecting D3 state road and the A6 motorway Oštrovica interchange to littoral area between Kraljevica, Crikvenica and Novi Vinodolski as well as the island of Krk, terminating at D8 intersection near Jadranovo. The road is 20.3 km long.

D501 is a connecting route providing a link between two major state roads (D3 and D8) and one motorway (A6). An additional motorway interchange, to A7 is planned, in Meja interchange, which is currently under construction.

In Križišće, there is a junction with D531 state road - a route to Kraljevica, Krk bridge and D102 state road.

The road, as well as all other state roads in Croatia, is managed and maintained by Hrvatske ceste, state owned company.

Traffic volume 

Traffic is regularly counted and reported by Hrvatske ceste, operator of the road. Substantial variations between annual (AADT) and summer (ASDT) traffic volumes are attributed to the fact that the road serves as a connection to A6 motorway and D8 state road carrying substantial tourist traffic.

Road junctions and populated areas

See also
 Autocesta Rijeka - Zagreb

Sources

State roads in Croatia
Transport in Primorje-Gorski Kotar County